Asthenoptycha is a little-studied genus of moths belonging to the large family Tortricidae. Nearly all known species are native to south-east Australia. Most species are under 20 mm and are well camouflaged, in mottled shades of brown and grey.

Species
Asthenoptycha conjunctana (Walker, 1863)
Asthenoptycha craterana (Meyrick, 1881)
Asthenoptycha encratopis (Meyrick, 1920)
Asthenoptycha epiglypta Meyrick, 1910 
Asthenoptycha hemicryptana Meyrick, 1881
Asthenoptycha heminipha (Turner, 1916)
Asthenoptycha iriodes (Lower, 1898)
Asthenoptycha sphaltica Meyrick, 1910
Asthenoptycha sphenotoma (Turner, 1945)
Asthenoptycha tolmera (Turner, 1945)

See also
List of Tortricidae genera

References

External links
tortricidae.com

Epitymbiini
Taxa named by Edward Meyrick
Tortricidae genera